The Shining is the solo debut album by American rapper and Insane Clown Posse member Violent J. It was released on April 28, 2009 (which was also his 37th birthday) under his own label Psychopathic Records. Mostly produced by Mike E. Clark, a music video for "Jealousy" was released in May 2009.

Production
Violent J states that he was not interested in developing a career as a solo performer, "but it was my turn at bat, and I wanted to deliver for any Violent J fans that might be out there". Unlike Wizard of the Hood, The Shining does not focus on a single concept or storyline, but instead focuses on multiple stories, themes, and subjects. The title of the album refers to charisma and confidence.

Violent J attempted to provide a variance for listeners by performing with different rapping styles on each track. Mike E. Clark produced the majority of the album, with Eric Davie providing additional production work. "Fight Club" features guest appearances by Esham and Necro. "Home Invasion" features an appearance by Shaggy 2 Dope. "Candyland" was developed during long late night recording sessions with Esham.

Release
The album was originally intended to be released in October 2008, followed by a 20 plus date solo tour across the country. Due to his dislike of touring solo, and wanting to focus more on Insane Clown Posse as a whole, Violent J decided to give away free copies of an early version of the album to those that attended the ninth annual Gathering of the Juggalos seminar.

Due to popular demand, it was announced that Psychopathic Records would release the album nationwide, and it was also given its final title. According to J, the final version of the album is significantly different from the pre-release version, and features improved sound quality, in addition to four new songs not present on the pre-release version. The album was released on J's 37th birthday.

Reception

The Shining peaked at #5 on the Billboard Top Independent Albums chart, #14 on the Top Rap Albums chart, #28 on the Top R&B/Hip-Hop Albums chart and #48 on the Billboard 200, with 10,000 copies sold in its first week.

Track listing

Chart positions

References

2009 debut albums
Albums produced by Mike E. Clark
Violent J albums
Psychopathic Records albums